Fog Lake is the musical alias of Canadian singer-songwriter Aaron Powell. Powell began writing and recording songs in his hometown of Glovertown, Newfoundland. In 2014, Powell moved from cassette label Birdtapes to become part of the New York based Orchid Tapes, run by Warren Hildebrand. Powell's recordings have been described as "a complex collage of nebulous angst and heartfelt nostalgia". Fog Lake's latest full-length release entitled Tragedy Reel was released on April 23rd, 2021.

History
Powell began working on music during high-school years in Glovertown, Newfoundland. The project began as ambient experiments, sampling and covers to "highly introspective, original recordings". Powell's music is crafted in DIY format, on shoestring budgets.

Powell's first release was a compilation entitled There's a Spirit, There's a Soul, composed of pop/ambient songs recorded in high school. The project began to develop a following after the release of Fog Lake's first full-length album, Farther Reaches, which was released independently in January 2013. Powell released the EP Holy Cross in June 2013 via Birdtapes. Powell then followed up Farther Reaches with a second full-length record, Virgo Indigo, released  February 2014. It received coverage from websites such as The Fader and No Fear of Pop. Powell continued to produce self-produced, DIY records such as Victoria Park in 2015 and Dragonchaser in 2017, both being released strictly on cassette format through Orchid Tapes, receiving coverage from Stereogum, SPIN, VICE and also touring with emo indie-rock Foxing (band).

Recent work
Victoria Park, the third full-length album from Powell was released on 30 June 2015 in both digital and physical formats. The album (along with Powell's previous work) can be downloaded for free or pay-what-you-can via Bandcamp. Fog Lake then released Dragonchaser on February 17, 2017 via Orchid Tapes, along with a self-released EP Inference 3, a reworking of demos previously released in 2012. Powell released his fifth full length entitled Captain through Dog Knights Records on July 5th 2018. His latest album Tragedy Reel was released on April 23rd, 2021.

Discography

Studio albums 
Farther Reaches (2013)
Virgo Indigo (2014)
Victoria Park (2015)
Dragonchaser (2017)
Captain (2018)
Tragedy Reel (2021)

EPS 
Holy Cross (2013)
Inference 3 (2017)
Fog Lake / Euphoria Again (2018)
Carousel (2018)

Compilations 
There's a Spirit, There's a Soul (2012)

References

External links
 Fog Lake on Bandcamp
 Fog Lake on Facebook
 Fog Lake on Soundcloud
 Fog Lake on Spotify

Canadian indie pop groups
Musicians from Newfoundland and Labrador
People from Newfoundland (island)
Living people
21st-century Canadian male singers
Canadian male singers
Canadian songwriters